Klara Geywitz (born 18 February 1976) is a German politician of the Social Democratic Party of Germany (SPD) serving as Federal Minister for Housing, Urban Development and Building in the Scholz cabinet since 2021. She served as member of the Landtag of Brandenburg from 2004 until 2019, and is a Deputy Leader of the SPD since 2019.

Early life and education
Klara Geywitz was born 1976 in Potsdam in the former German Democratic Republic. She studied political science at the University of Potsdam. In 1994, Geywitz became a member of the Social Democratic Party of Germany.

Political career

From 2004 until 2019, Geywitz was a member of the Landtag of Brandenburg. Among other committee assignments, she served on the Budget Committee from 2009 until 2014. She was always elected in First-past-the-post voting for her electoral district in Potsdam, until she was defeated in the 2019 state election by Greens candidate Marie Schäffer.

From 2008 until 2013, Geywitz served as deputy chairwoman of the SPD in Brandenburg, under the leadership of its chairman Matthias Platzeck. From 2013 until 2017, she was the party's Secretary General, this time under chairman Dietmar Woidke.

In the negotiations to form a fourth cabinet under Chancellor Angela Merkel following the 2017 elections, Geywitz was part of her party's delegation.

In the 2019 SPD leadership election, Geywitz announced she would run as co-chair, together with incumbent Vice Chancellor Olaf Scholz. In the final voting round, she and Scholz were defeated winning 45 per cent of the party base, while  Saskia Esken and Norbert Walter-Borjans won with 53 per cent of the vote. At a SPD national convention in 2019, Geywitz was later elected as one of the five deputies of the party's co-chairs Esken and Walter-Borjans. in December 2021, she was re-elected at the SPD national convention .

Since 2020, Geywitz has been working for the Brandenburg Court of Audit.

On 6 December 2021, she was announced as Federal Minister for Housing, Urban Development and Building in the Scholz cabinet.

Other activities

Corporate boards
 Deutsche Druck- und Verlagsgesellschaft (DDVG), Member of the Supervisory Board

Non-profit organizations
 German Poland Institute (DPI), Member of the Board of Trustees (since 2022)
 Foundation for Polish-German Cooperation, Member of the Board
 Leo Baeck Foundation, Member of the Board of Trustees

Political positions
In 2020, following Thomas Oppermann’s death, Geywitz endorsed Dagmar Ziegler as his successor in the office of Vice-President of the German Bundestag.

Personal life
Geywitz is married and has three children.

References

1976 births
Living people
Members of the Landtag of Brandenburg
People from Potsdam
Social Democratic Party of Germany politicians
Women government ministers of Germany
Women federal government ministers of Germany